Chen Xiao (born 11 March 1999) is a Chinese water polo player. She competed in the 2020 Summer Olympics.

References

1999 births
Living people
Water polo players at the 2020 Summer Olympics
Chinese female water polo players
Olympic water polo players of China
Asian Games gold medalists for China
Asian Games medalists in water polo
Water polo players at the 2018 Asian Games
Medalists at the 2018 Asian Games
21st-century Chinese women